Hanuman Natya Graha is a prominent theatre centre, which hosts plays primarily in the Konkani and Marathi languages, in the North Goa commercial town of Mapusa.

Buildings and structures in Mapusa